This is a list of the longest place names in Ireland. It includes names written in English as a single word of at least 20 letters. The vast majority of English-language place names in Ireland are anglicisations of Irish language names. The spelling which has legal force is usually that used by the Ordnance Survey of Ireland. Many of Ireland's longest place names are found in the far west of the island, where the Irish language has survived the longest; including Gaeltacht areas, where it is still the vernacular. These names are generally written as multiple words in Irish.

At 22 letters long, Muckanaghederdauhaulia (from Muiceanach idir Dhá Sháile meaning "pig-marsh between two saltwaters") is often believed to be Ireland's longest one-word place name. In Life: A User's Manual by Georges Perec, it is one of the ports visited and painted by the character Bartlebooth, who believes it to be the longest port name in the world. An 1830s boundary survey uses the spelling Mwickanaghedderauhaulia, which is 23 letters long.

However, the Placenames Database of Ireland (logainm.ie) records several other place names of at least 22 letters. Furthermore, the anglicised form Muckanaghederdauhaulia ceased to have official standing in 2005, after a Placenames Order was made under the Official Languages Act 2003; the sole official name is now the Irish form Muiceanach idir Dhá Sháile.

Multiple-word place names may be longer still. For example, "Plughoge and Leabrannagh Mountain North", the name of a townland in County Donegal, has 35 letters, and its Irish equivalent "Sliabh Phlochóige agus Leadhb Reannach Thuaidh" has 41; while "Stack's to Mullaghareirk Mountains, West Limerick Hills and Mount Eagle Special Protection Area 004161" has 81 letters and 6 digits.

List
The spellings and locations given in the table are those on the Ordnance Survey's current and historic maps. Three of the top names are at the ruins on Inishmore of the church dedicated of the Four Comely Saints.

Notes:

Variant, historical, and spurious spellings
John O'Donovan recommended "Illaunloughmorenavreaghoge" (26 letters) as the name of an island in "Loughnavreeghougue" in Clynagh townland, Killannin parish, Moycullen barony, County Galway. He noted "Illaunloughmorenavreeghougue" (28 letters) as the local spelling. However, the Ordnance Survey went with "Lough Morenavreaghoge" for the lake, and left the island unnamed, while the Irish Placenames Database gives the name "Illaunmore" for an island in Clynagh.

Two lakes called "Loughs Nahaskanabaunia" on the Ordnance Survey map correspond to the entry "Loughsnahaskanabaunia" (21 letters) in the Placenames Database. The townland of Brackagh Slieve Gallion in County Londonderry has sometimes been written as one 21-letter word, Brackaghslievegallion, or similar. Similarly, Lisbellanagroagh More in County Antrim has been written Lisbellanagroaghmore (20 letters).

An 1829 calendar of Stuart patent rolls in the Irish Chancery includes  Knockatoodreknocknynuyshaneboye (31 letters) and Aghannyquillaknockacarnoc (25 letters) from 1611 as subdenominations within "Gortnemureknock" (now Gortinure and Knocks) County Fermanagh; Grangeballaghmarramacquoid (26 letters) in Armagh in 1616; and Ballylirstrillyvickenratty (26 letters) for Tullymacarath, County Down in 1609. The spelling Ballemickegillemorreyietragh (28 letters; later "Ballymackilmurry etra" in the townland of Ballymackilmurry) is recorded in a 1609 inquisition into the churchlands of County Armagh made in preparation for the Plantation of Ulster. Salters Grange, County Armagh is called Grangeballaghmarramacquoid (26 letters) in inquisitions of 1557 and 1614.   The 1654 Civil Survey of County Tipperary records Glayshlackeenetanballyuore (26 letters) as the name of a "small brooke" forming part of the boundary of Oughterleague parish by the townland of Demone; Aghknockanecurryheeneliegh (26 letters) a ford on the boundary of Moyne parish in Tipperary; and Barrecoroughbollinbraykon (25 letters) a "littel stream" on the border of Gorey barony. A place named Caherhewlissingaberrighe (24 letters) in Galway or Roscommon is mentioned in a 1578 fiant.  An 1825 index of placenames in the decrees of innocence registered under the Act of Settlement 1662 includes Gortecoleighshraghmicknuckgenny (31 letters), Ballynygorenagheyannyneaghe (27 letters) and	Laghirtydonellanknockane (24 letters).

The Placenames Database of Ireland includes an entry for "Lougheroaghballaghdown" (22 letters), apparently a misspelt duplicate of "Lough Croaghballaghdown". An 1824 return of townlands in Mayo includes one of 48 acres in the parish of "Torlogh" (now Turlough), barony of Carra, named "Knockballymackellygirrenane [27 letters] Tully". This is a mistranscription of "Knockballymackelly, Grenane, and Tully[quirke]", now the townland of Greenans.

See also
 Place names in Ireland
 List of long place names
 Two Irish towns with 19-letter names:
 Newtownmountkennedy
 Castletownbere, sometimes called Castletownberehaven

References

Citations

Sources
 
 
 

Lists of place names
Irish toponymy
Placenames in Ireland